The Darling Peninsula is located on the eastern coast of Ellesmere Island, a part of the Qikiqtaaluk Region of the Canadian territory of Nunavut. It stretches eastward into Nares Strait, north of Dobbin Bay.

The Geomagnetic North Pole is located on the Darling Peninsula.

References

External links
 Photo, largest Greenland erratic on Darling Peninsula

Ellesmere Island
Peninsulas of Qikiqtaaluk Region